Assistance Publique–Hôpitaux de Paris (AP-HP) is the university hospital trust operating in Paris and its surroundings. It is the largest hospital system in Europe and one of the largest in the world.  It receives an average of more than 10 million patients per year.

It employs more than 90,000 people  in 44 hospitals and receives more than 10 million annual patient visits.

It is linked with the University of Paris and its seven colleges of medicine, two of odontology and two of pharmacy as AP-HP is the university hospital for the capital and its surroundings.

AP-HP is organized in several hospital local trusts, each associated to a faculty to offer integrative care to its population.

As a teaching hospital, AP-HP Trust is in charge of training healthcare professionals and doctors, and plays a prominent role in French healthcare research alongside Inserm.

History 
Succeeding to the conseil général des hospices de Paris, the Administration générale de l'Assistance publique was created by a law of January 10, 1849.  In 1961, the AP-HP became the hospital system of Paris and its suburbs.

Administration

Hospitals 
Not all hospitals in AP-HP have all the specialties. AP-HP is characterized by very specialized departments which allows offering the best care for patients by very experienced professionals. Within the same specialty, different departments in different hospitals are experts in different branches of the same specialty.  

AP-HP is not the sole healthcare operator in Paris. The trust shares with duties alongside military hospitals such as Val-de-Grâce, or Institut Curie, and Institut Gustave Roussy, Europe's leading cancer-research institute and the biggest health center dedicated to oncology in Europe.

References

External links 

 Assistance Publique–Hôpitaux de Paris

Hospitals in Île-de-France
Hospital networks